In Australian football codes, the term state league is used to describe competition at a level below that of national leagues. Most of these competitions are based in a single state, and from this the term originates.

History
The Australian federation consists of six states and two territories. Historically the highest level of club-based sports were the various leagues based in each state and territory. The change to national leagues began in 1977 when the National Soccer League was formed with clubs in most capital cities. Australian football and rugby leagues followed suit during the 1980s when the Victorian and New South Welsh leagues began to admit clubs from other states.

State leagues by sport

Association football (soccer)
Australian Capital Territory – ACT Premier League
New South Wales – NSW Premier League and Northern New South Wales State Football League
Northern Territory – na
Queensland – Queensland State League
South Australia – South Australian Super League
Tasmania – Northern Premier League and Southern Premier League
Victoria – Victorian Premier League
Western Australia – Football West State League

Australian rules football
Australian Capital Territory – North East Australian Football League
New South Wales – North East Australian Football League
Northern Territory – North East Australian Football League
Queensland – North East Australian Football League
South Australia – South Australian National Football League
Tasmania – Tasmanian State League
Victoria – Victorian Football League
Western Australia – West Australian Football League

Rugby league
Australian Capital Territory – na
New South Wales – New South Wales Cup
Northern Territory – Darwin Rugby League
Queensland – Queensland Cup
South Australia – Adelaide First Grade Premiership
Tasmania – Tasmanian First Grade Premiership
Victoria – Melbourne Rugby League
Western Australia – Perth First Grade

Netball
 Netball NSW Premier League
 HART Sapphire Series
 Netball South Australia Premier League 
 Victorian Netball League
 West Australian Netball League

References